Pyridine-4-carbaldehyde is an organic compound with the formula C5H4NCHO.  It is one of three isomeric pyridinaldehydes.  The other isomers are pyridine-2-carboxaldehyde and pyridine-3-carboxaldehyde.  Pyridine-4-carboxaldehyde is a colorless liquid, although aged samples can appear yellow or even brown. It undergoes many reactions expected for aromatic aldehydes such as reductive amination and Schiff base formation.  It condenses with pyrrole to give tetrapyridylporphyrin. The pKa has been experimentally determined by NMR spectroscopy to be 4.72.

References 

Aromatic aldehydes
4-Pyridyl compounds